The 2013 Road to the Kentucky Derby  was based on a points system that replaced the previous system which consisted of about 185 graded stakes races worldwide. The series is divided into two phases, the Kentucky Derby Prep Season and the Kentucky Derby Championship Series.

The top 20 point earners earned a spot in the Kentucky Derby starting gate. Up to 24 horses could enter the race and four horses can be listed as "also eligible" and would be ranked in order accordingly in case any horse(s) be scratched prior to the race. If two or more horses have the same number of points, the tiebreaker to get into the race will be earnings in non-restricted stakes races, whether or not they are graded. In the event of a tie, those horses will divide equally the points they would have received jointly had one beaten the other. Horses listed as "also eligible" are not allowed to participate in the race once wagering is opened.

The 2013 season consisted of 36 races, 19 races for the Kentucky Derby Prep Season and 17 races for the Kentucky Derby Championship Season.

See also

 Road to the Kentucky Oaks

References

External links
Churchill Downs official web site
Road to the Kentucky Derby Point System

Road to the Kentucky Derby, 2013
Road to the Kentucky Derby
Road to the Kentucky Derby